The International Communist Party (ICP) is a left communist international political party which is often described as Bordigist due to the contributions by longtime member Amadeo Bordiga, although the adherents of the party don't define themselves as Bordigists.

Origins

1910 
At the Italian Socialist Party's (PSI) Congress of Milan, the Left opposed what they perceived as "reformism" in the leadership of the party and the trade unions. The Left strongly opposed the Italo-Turkish War, in attempting to demonstrate their belief in Proletarian internationalism and organized itself nationally as the Left Communist Faction at the Reggio Emilia Congress of 1912. A similar conflict broke out in the Socialist Youth Federation against alleged "reformists" by the Left. The Left asserted that both the communist party and Young Federation were "organs of struggle". Amadeo Bordiga was a large influence on the party ideologically.

1914–1917 
At the time of World War I the Left espoused revolutionary defeatism, a Leninist theory. At the outbreak of the October Revolution, the Left aligned itself with Lenin and his ideology of Leninism, the first sign of what they thought would be an international revolution. “Bolshevism, A Plant for Every Clime”, a piece written by party ideologist Bordiga, favorably spoke of the revolution.

1919 
1919 was seen as a "crucial year" by Left Communists due to the German and Hungarian revolutions, which they viewed as being part of a trend of world revolution that the great October socialist revolution began. In Italy, a polemic began between the Left and Antonio Gramsci over the role of soviets in Italy. The Left then started an Abstentionist faction, which was founded in the PSI, due to the Left's views in regards to participation in elections.

1920–1924 
At the Second Congress of the Third International, the Left opposed the Third International's structure, preferring an international party, as well as its requirement of democratic centralism. Lead by the Left, the Communist Party of Italy was founded in Livorno. After the arrest of Bordiga and many of the party’s leaders in early 1923, the Left was voted out of the leadership. Now led by Gramsci and Togliatti. The new majority within the party successfully opposed the Left and begun to purge their remaining members.

1926–1930 
The left faction of the PCd'I was formally established in July 1927 by a number of young militants. The Left supported and briefly affiliated with the Russian opposition until the relations soured due to differences between the Left and Trotsky. In the meanwhile, Bordiga was kicked out of the party for refusing to condemn Trotsky.

1930–1940 
With Bordiga under continuous police surveillance and isolated in Naples, the Left voted out of the party, it could only exist as an exile group. In 1938, the left fraction which was organized in several countries at this point formed the International Communist Left.

History 
In 1943, the Internationalist Communist Party was founded as Partito Comunista Internazionalista in Italy around Onorato Damen and Bruno Maffi and was soon joined by the international fraction. They opposed the anti fascist partisans that fought the fascist Mussolini regime, leading to accusations of being German agents due to their opposition to anti-fascism. Nevertheless, the party managed to attract a portion of the partisans to their positions.

Partito Comunista Internazionalista formed several federations, the leading ones being in Turin, Milan and Parma. It agitated in factories by forming "Internationalist Communist Factory Groups", advocating for the formation of workers' councils.

In December 1945, Partito Comunista Internazionalista held its first national conference in Turin, now as a larger party. Bordiga was absent from this conference, since he did not become a member of the party until 1949, although he made individual contributions to it. In the congress, the hints about the future split in the Party appeared. Disagreements crystallized with Damen and Stefanini on one hand who were in favor of participation in elections and democratic centralism and the supporters of Bordiga who was for abstentionism and organic centralism.

Partito Comunista Internazionalista kept growing, claiming to possess 13 federations and 72 sections.

Splits broke out in the party regarding achieving socialism through reform, approach to trade unions, and support for national liberation.

In 1952, a majority supported Damen, who rejected any hope of conquering the unions and any support for national liberation, against a Bordiga who still defended the positions of the Communist International on these issues.

In 1952, there were two Partito Comunista Internazionalistas in Italy, both laying claim to Lenin and the Italian communist left. The party led by Bordiga soon started publishing Il Programma Comunista where the majority group held on to Prometeo and Battaglia Comunista.

The party (publishing Il Programma Comunista) took the name International Communist Party soon after the split.

In 1964, a new split gave its birth named as Rivoluzione Comunista (RC) which made its critique of organic centralism and the party's programmatism, proposing to intervene more actively in the class.

Until his death in 1970, Bordiga devoted himself to contributing to the task of reconstructing the theoretical and political basis of the Party. The "Fundamental Theses of the Party" (1951), "Considerations on the Organic Activity of the Party in a Situation which is Generally and Historically Unfavorable" (1965), "Theses on the Historic Duty, the Action and Structure of the World Communist Party" (1965), and "Supplementary Theses" (1966) gave the party its theoretical, political, and organizational structure.

In late 1973 the ICP underwent a serious split, where a group of militants lead by the Florence section were expelled and had to reorganize and move forward, publishing Il Partito Comunista. The International Communist Party continues publishing in several languages, including the English paper "The Communist Party" and magazine "Communist Left". 

Meanwhile, in 1982, the Il Programma ICP was decimated by further splits within their ranks, particularly in France and Italy. From one of these splits came a number of new organizations under the ICP name, one of which publishes Le Prolétaire in France and Il Comunista in Italy, and another publishes "El Comunista" in Spain.

There have been several tendencies and organizations over the years which have more or less claimed their heritage to International (Italian) Communist Left or directly to the original International Communist Party. Another tendency that claims to carry the legacy of the ICP is a group (expressly not a party) started in 1981 called 'n + 1' which publishes the review under same name and collects their volumes and booklet including articles and more detailed treatments of various subjects in the series "Quaderni Internazionalisti".

Theses

On Marxist theory 
The International Communist Party holds that the doctrine of the party is founded on the principles of the historical materialism of the critical communism set out by Marx and Engels in The Communist Manifesto, Das Capital, and their other fundamental works and which formed the basis of the Communist International constituted in 1919 and of the Italian Communist Party founded at Leghorn in 1921 as a section of the Communist International and was a unitary and invariant body. The class party is accepted as the indispensable organ for the proletarian revolutionary struggle. It has always held that the party must historically get rid, once and for all, of the practice of alliances, even for transitory issues, with the petty bourgeoisie as well as with the pseudo-proletarian and reformist parties.

On tasks 
Holding that the Communist Party consists of the most advanced and resolute part of the proletariat, uniting the efforts of the working masses transforming their struggles for group interests and contingent issues into the general struggle for the revolutionary emancipation of the proletariat; the International Communist Party states that the duties of the party are propagating the revolutionary theory among the masses, organizing the material means of action, leading the working class all along its struggle, by securing the historical continuity and the international unity of the movement.

According to the International Communist Party, the party is not made up of all members of the proletariat or even of its majority. It is the organization of the minority which has, collectively, reached and mastered revolutionary tactics in theory and in practice; in other words, which sees clearly the general objectives of the historic movement of the proletariat in the whole world and for the whole of the historical course which separates the period of its formation from that of its final victory. The party is not formed on the basis of individual consciousness; the International Communist Party emphasizes that it is not possible for each worker to become conscious and still less to master the class doctrine in a cultural way, neither is this possible for each militant nor even for the leaders of the Party as individuals. To them, this consciousness lay in the organic unity of the Party. The Party is the organic tissue whose function inside the working class is to carry out its revolutionary task in all its aspects and in its successive phases.

Stressing the importance of the unity of the proletariat, the International Communist Party states that the party should never set up economic associations which exclude those workers who do not accept its principles and leadership. All forms of closed organizations that separate the working class are rejected. The ICP remains resolutely against the participation in the parliamentary elections.

On opportunism 
The International Communist Party defines opportunism as a wave of degeneration of proletarian parties. In opposition to opportunism, it rejects the subordination of the party's action to that of political committees of fronts, coalitions or alliances even if this subordination was to restrict itself to public declarations and be compensated by internal instructions to militants or the party and by the subjective intentions of the leaders. It holds that in the West all alliances or proposals of alliances with social democratic or petit-bourgeois parties should be refused at all costs; in other words that there should be no united political front. According to the International Communist Party, what made the parties unable to foresee and face the opportunist danger was a fundamental deviation in principles: the party states that it was neither internal democracy nor free elections which give the Party its nature of being the most conscious fraction of the proletariat and its function of revolutionary guide. It is instead the matter of a deep discrepancy of conceptions about the deterministic organicity of the party as a historical body, living in the reality of the class struggle.

On action 
The principal activity today is accepted to be the re-establishment of the theory of Marxist communism by the International Communist Party. The party will bring forward no new theory, but reaffirm the full validity of the fundamental theses of revolutionary Marxism, amply confirmed by facts and falsified and betrayed by opportunism to cover up retreats and defeats. The International Communist Party denounces and defends combating the Stalinists as revisionists and opportunists. Oral and written propaganda are seen as an important party action. The cult of the individual is rejected as a very dangerous aspect of opportunism which should be fought, while the Party retains complete autonomy from all other political groups, parties, formations and fronts.

Publications

Il Partito Comunista 
Following a major split in 1973, the reorganized International Communist Party, sometimes called Florentine, began publishing their magazine, Il Partito Comunista, soon thereafter. In 1979, it began publication of the theoretical review, Comunismo. Il Partito has sections in Italy, the United States, Canada, France, England, Spain, Germany and Venezuela, and publishes in several languages. The ICP's English periodicals are The Communist Left and The Communist Party.
 Party Website

Il Programma Comunista
Following an important split in 1973, this group continued publishing Il Programma Comunista. The organization underwent crippling splits in 1982. Beside Il Programma Comunista, it now publishes a journal in English (The Internationalist) and a journal in German (Kommunistisches Programm).
 Website

Il Comunista 
Il Comunista exists in Italy, Switzerland, Spain and France. It publishes newspapers in both Italian and French with other journals in Spanish and English.
 Website

El Comunista and The Internationalist Proletarian 
It publishes El Comunista in Spanish and Catalan and The Internationalist Proletarian in English, as well as publications in Italian. It is active in Spain, Venezuela and Italy.
 Party Website

Sul Filo Rosso del Tempo 
Following a final crippling explosion in 1982, the reorganized Partito Comunista Internazionale began publishing their magazine, Sul Filo Rosso del Tempo. The party is (probably only) located in Italy.
 https://web.archive.org/web/20160304110534/http://www.sinistracomunistainternazionale.it/. Archived from original on March 4, 2016.

Il Bollettino 
Il Bollettino is a group which existed only in Italy and published only in Italian. The organization was founded in 1982 and their magazine was regularly published for some years; it's unknown if this group is still active.
 Issues of Il Bollettino

See also 
 Internationalist Communist Party (Italy)
 Internationalist Communist Party (France)
 Invariance

References

External links 
 n + 1
 What Distinguishes Our Party
 The Unitary and invariant Body of Party Thesis
 ICP English press Communist Left
 International Library of the Communist Left
 Philippe Bourrinet, The "Bordigist" Current, (1912-1952) at "Left Wing" Communism - an infantile disorder?
 Rivoluzione Comunista

Bordigism
Left communist internationals
Political parties established in 1943
Transnational political parties